William K. Flynn (c. 1896 – October 9, 1958) was an American football coach. He served as the head coach at Loyola University New Orleans from 1921 to 1923, compiling a record of 11–8–2.

Biography
Flynn attended the College of the Holy Cross, where he played on the football team. He graduated in 1921.

In May 1921, the Loyola University New Orleans hired Flynn as its athletic director and football coach. He was tasked with starting up an athletics program at the school, and he coached the football team in its inaugural season in 1921. Although the Associated Press described the first season as "unsuccessful", Flynn improved the team incrementally over his next two years. In 1923, Loyola compiled a 5–1–1 record. After three seasons at the helm, Flynn stepped down as coach and was replaced by Moon Ducote.

In 1934, he became the head football coach at Morristown High School in Morristown, New Jersey, a post he held until his death. A resident of Morristown, Flynn died on October 9, 1958 at Morristown Memorial Hospital.

Head coaching record

College

References

Year of birth uncertain
1958 deaths
Holy Cross Crusaders football players
Loyola Wolf Pack athletic directors
Loyola Wolf Pack football coaches
High school football coaches in New Jersey
People from Morristown, New Jersey